Yair Qedar (born June 13, 1969) is an Israeli documentary filmmaker, social activist and former journalist.

Chronicling the lives of Jewish and Israeli figures of the modern Hebrew literary canon, Qedar's 19 feature length documentaries have all premiered at film festivals and have won the director over 20 prizes.

Career 
Since the early nineties, Qedar has been involved in journalistic writing and editing. He has written for Schocken, Haaretz, and Davar, and served as editor and deputy editor of travel magazine Masa Acher. Qedar has won the Allied Prize for World Jewish Press and the European Union Award for Journalistic Reporting in the Mediterranean Basin.

After studying 20th century Hebrew literature at Tel Aviv University, Qedar launched Ha'Ivrim (Hebrew: The Hebrews), a project in which Qedar makes one-hour biographical  documentaries about writers and poets part of the Hebrew literary canon. The films are generally cinematic portraits, and are interspersed with archival footage, interviews, sound fragments and contemporary animation. The documentaries have all premiered in film festivals, aired on Israeli TV, and circulated far and wide in cinemas, cinematheques, community and cultural centers, in Israel and around the world (United States and Canada, Europe, Australia and Russia), earning multiple awards. 

Qedar released his debut feature film Gay Days in 2009. The documentary documents the emergence of the LGBT community in Israel and is based on his own personal story along with the stories of other prominent gay men and women in Israel (Gal Uchovsky, Eytan Fox, Dana International, Offer Nissim, among others). It premiered in May 2009 in Tel Aviv at the Docaviv International Documentary Film Festival, and was also screened at the official opening of the Tel Aviv Gay Pride. The film was the official selection of the Tel Aviv International LGBT Film Festival (TLVFest) and of the Panorama section at the 60th Berlin International Film Festival.

Qedar's The 5 Houses of Leah Goldberg (2011), chronicles the life of the poet Leah Goldberg. The documentary was the official selection of Docaviv Film Festival 2011 and Doc Aviv Galilee 2011. It won three prizes at the 2011 Israeli Documentary Film Competition: for editing (for Ayelet Ofarim), soundtrack design (for Aviv Aldama) and original music (for Eli Sorni and Carolina). The film was sponsored by the Israeli Film Service, The New Foundation for Cinema and TV and The Second Authority for Television and Radio. Together with Gideon Tikotsky, he initiated the celebrations of the centenary of Leah Goldberg, during which dozens of cultural events and initiatives were held.

The Seven Tapes (2012), about the life of the poet Yona Wallach, was official selected at the 2012 Jerusalem Film Festival. Competing at the Israeli Documentary Film Competition, it won Best Film of 2012 and Best Soundtrack of 2012. It was also screened at the Sha'ar International Poetry Festival in Haifa. The film was sponsored by the Israeli Film Service, Channel 8 and The Rabinovich Foundation for the Arts.

Bialik, King of the Jews, covering the life and art of poet Hayim Nahman Bialik, was an official selection at the Docaviv Film Festival and at the Miami Jewish Film Festival. It premiered in the spring of 2014 in cinematheques and on Israeli Channel 8. It was nominated as Best Documentary Film at the 2014 Israeli Documentary Competition.

In 2015, Qedar released The Awakener, the story of Yosef Haim Brenner, and Zelda - A Simple Woman, on the life and work of the poet Zelda Mishkovsky. The Awakener was an official selection at the 2015 Docaviv International Documentary Film Festival while Zelda, A Simple Woman was an official selection at the 2015 Jerusalem Film Festival, where it won the Jewish Experience Award, the Jewish International Film Festival, and the Warsaw Jewish Film Festival. It also won the Lia van Leer Award for Films about Jewish Heritage. The films were sponsored by the Israeli Film Service, The Avi Chai Foundation, Channel 1 and The Makor Foundation. 

From 2015 to 2017, Qedar collaborated with actor Ilan Peled, co-directing and producing the mockumentary mini-series Vanished, about the marginalization and discrimination of female artists in Israel. The serie's first film, Lilian (about a fictional poet), was screened at the 2016 Haifa Film Festival, where it won the first prize in the documentary competition, the Rozalia Katz Award for Best Documentary Film. The move was criticized, and many called for the film's disqualification, claiming it did not meet the criteria of the genre. However, the festival management refused to do so. In 2017, it was nominated for an Ophir Award. The nomination was controversial, as the film deals with a fictional character. Gidi Orsher, a member of the board of the Film Academy, told Haaretz that in his eyes the film was not a documentary in any way, saying "If it misses like a duck and measures like a duck and it tastes like a duck - then it's probably a duck. For a movie to be documentary it has to be about real and uninvented characters. You can make a documentary about Superman but you can not determine that Superman is a real character." The serie's second film, Yona, followed a Yemenite dancer, and was an official selection at the 2016 Jerusalem Jewish Film Festival. The serie's final film, Bebe, about fictional transgender actress, was an official selection of the 2017 Tel Aviv International LGBTQ+ Film Festival.

In 2018, Qedar released Vogel Lost Vogel, a film documenting the life and work of David Fogel. It received was screened at the Haifa Film Festival, where it received a special mention.

In 2021, Qedar released The Last Chapter of AB Yehoshua, a documentary about A. B. Yehoshua. It was an official selection at the 2021 Jerusalem Film Festival, where it competed in the Diamond Competition for Israeli Documentary Films. The film was sponsored by Kan and The Rabinovich Foundation for the Arts.

Following Israeli writer and social activist Amos Oz's death in 2018, Qedar directed and produced The Fourth Window, a documentary unveiling the life, work and tragedies of Amos Oz's life. Sponsored by Kan, Arte ZDF, and SVT, it was officially selected at the 2021 Thessaloniki Film Festival, the 2021 Docaviv Film Festival, the 2021 DocuText Film Festival, the 2021 Warsaw International Film Festival, and the 2021 Mumbai International Film Festival, where it won Best Documentary. It also won a Special Mention Award at the Weil Bloch Film Awards.

Qedar has taught film at the Sam Spiegel School in Jerusalem, and at various academic institutions, including the Shenkar School, Beit Berl College and Emek Yizrael College.

Activism
In addition to his work as a documentary maker, Qedar is a prominent member of the Israeli LGBT community. He founded the country's first gay newspaper HaZman HaVarod (Pink Time), where he served as editor. He also served as the editor-in-chief of Another Journey magazine. 

Qedar was founding editor of Pink Time, Israel's first gay, lesbian and transgender newspaper, writes in various publications, such as Haaretz, Yedioth Ahronoth, Masa Acher, and is recipient of various journalistic prizes, including winner of the B'nai B'rith World Center Award for Journalism in 2003, and Euromed Heritage Journalistic Award in 2005 and 2006.

In 2003, Qedar edited the first gay theatre show in Israel in 1994, as well as Beyond Sexuality, an anthology of gay and lesbian studies. In 2010, alongside Yossi Berg, he co-founded Rainbow Families Organization, aimed at promoting the rights, understanding and position of LGBT families in Israel. 

His debut documentary Gay Days depicts Israel's so-called "pink revolution".

In 2021, he and his partners launched the Proud Community Heritage Project.

Filmography

Personal life 
Kedar was born and raised in Afula. He attended Tel Aviv University in the 1990s, graduating with a bachelor's and master's degree in Hebrew literature.

In 2003, his son Michael Ron Qedar was born, in joint parenting with journalist Zahara Ron. In 2017 he married Gidon Yona in a civil marriage in Denmark, which was later recognized by the Israeli Ministry of the Interior.

Qedar lives in Tel Aviv.

Awards and accolades

References

Further reading
 
 Yair Qedar at the Israeli Film Center

Israeli journalists
Israeli LGBT screenwriters
Israeli LGBT rights activists
Living people
1969 births
Israeli documentary filmmakers
Israeli male screenwriters
LGBT film directors
Israeli LGBT journalists
Israeli gay writers
Gay screenwriters
Gay Jews